George McLean may refer to:

Politicians
 George P. McLean (1857–1932), American Senator from Connecticut
 George McLean (Canadian politician) (1885–1975), Canadian Member of Parliament, 1935–1945
 George McLean (New Zealand politician) (1834–1917), New Zealand Member of Parliament
 George McLean (golfer) (1893–1951), American professional golfer

Sportsmen
 George McLean (footballer, born 1898), Scottish footballer
 George McLean (footballer, born 1937), Scottish footballer
 George McLean (footballer, born 1943), Scottish international footballer

Others
 George McLean (journalist) (1923–2016), Canadian news anchor and journalist
 George F. McLean (1929–2016), professor of philosophy of the Catholic University of America